Presidential elections were held in Chile on February 13, 1827 after the National Congress of Chile decided by vote to elect a new president.

Following the coup d'état by Colonel Enrique Campino and the resignation of vice president and acting president —since Manuel Blanco Encalada's resignation— Agustín Eyzaguirre, Congress petitioned General Ramón Freire to take the seat of president on January 30, 1827.

On February 5, Freire presented his resignation before Congress, which decided to elect a new president of the Republic on February 13. The Congress elected Freire as the new president with 37 votes, and Francisco Antonio Pinto as vice president with 27 votes, from a total of 48 deputies present. Congress knew Freire would resign after Pinto's arrival in Santiago, so the election was only a sign of appreciation towards him.

Pinto's election, although won with a scant majority, signified a great victory for the liberals.

Results

President

Vice President

Presidential elections in Chile
Chile
President
Chile
Election and referendum articles with incomplete results